Alan Jope (born 1964) is a British businessman, and the CEO of Unilever since January 2019, succeeding Paul Polman.

Education
Jope was born in Scotland. He  earned a bachelor of commerce degree from the University of Edinburgh Business School. He also attended Harvard Business School's general management program in 2001.

Career
Jope joined Unilever in 1985 as a graduate marketing trainee. He was the president of Beauty & Personal Care, the largest division at Unilever. He has had stints running several operations including China.

From 2009, Jope led Unilever's business in China and North Asia, doubling its size and laying important foundations for future success. He was appointed to Unilever’s Leadership Executive in 2011 in his role as President of Unilever’s businesses across North Asia. His previous senior roles have also included President Russia, Africa & Middle East; and President of Unilever's Beauty & Personal Care division. Earlier, Jope worked in a number of sales and marketing roles in the UK, Thailand and the US.

Jope was a guest judge, with Donald Trump, in the second series of the US version of reality TV show The Apprentice.

Personal
Jope is married, with three children.

References

1960s births
Living people
Unilever people
20th-century Scottish businesspeople
21st-century Scottish businesspeople
Scottish chief executives
Alumni of the University of Edinburgh Business School